Eurytides marcellinus, the Jamaican kite, is a species of butterfly in the family Papilionidae. It is endemic to Jamaica. Its conservation status is rated as vulnerable.

References

Further reading

Edwin Möhn, 2002 Schmetterlinge der Erde, Butterflies of the world Part XIIII (14), Papilionidae VIII: Baronia, Euryades, Protographium, Neographium, Eurytides. Edited by Erich Bauer and Thomas Frankenbach Keltern: Goecke & Evers; Canterbury: Hillside Books.  All species and subspecies are included, also most of the forms. Several females are shown the first time in colour.

Eurytides
Endemic fauna of Jamaica
Butterflies of Jamaica
Taxonomy articles created by Polbot
Butterflies described in 1845